Hafla is a live album by Khaled composed of highlights from his Kenza Tour 97 in Confolens, France and Leuven, Belgium except for the track "Chebba" which was recorded in Bordeaux.

Track listing
"Didi" – 5:27
"Sahra" – 3:53
"Aïcha" – 5:07
"Chebba" – 4:54
"Abdel Kader" – 4:39
"Ouelli El Darek" – 4:39
"N'ssi N'ssi" – 4:07
"Lillah" – 4:55
"La Camel" – 5:44
"Wahrane Wahrane" – 4:47
"Ragda" – 5:26
"Walou Walou" – 5:45
"Mauvais Sang" – 6:56
"El Harba" – 7:16

References 

Khaled (musician) albums
1998 live albums